Pedro Gomes de Abreu (14th-century) was a Portuguese nobleman, Lord of Regalados and Valadares, Alcaide of Lapela.

Biography 

Pedro was the son of Diogo Gomes de Abreu and Leonor Viegas do Rego. His wife was Aldonça de Sousa descendant of Afonso III of Portugal and Marina Pires de Enxara.

References 

14th-century Portuguese people
15th-century Portuguese people
Portuguese nobility
Portuguese Roman Catholics